Santokh Singh Dhir (1920–2010) was an Indian writer and poet who wrote in Punjabi. He was known for his stories Koee Ik Sawaar, Sanjhi Kandh and Saver Hon Tak. He was awarded the Sahitya Akademi Award for his story collection Pakhi (1991) in 1996 by the Government of India. He died on 8 February 2010.

Life and works 

Singh was born on 2 December 1920, to a Sikh father and Hindu mother, in a little village of Dadheri that now falls under Fatehgarh district of Indian Punjab. He first worked as a tailor and then as a journalist for Preetlarhi, a monthly magazine but was temporary. Later, he started as a full-time writer and wrote about 50 books including novels, story anthologies, poetic and an autobiography, Brahaspati (1998).

Family 

His father Giani Isher Singh Dard was a poet and his mother Jamni Devi alias Gursharan Kaur was a housewife. He was married to Surinder Kaur and survived by his four daughters and a son.

Awards 

He received the Sahitya Akademi Award for his story collection, Pakhi (1991) in 1996. Language Department of Punjab honored him with Shromani Sahitkar Award in 1991 and Punjabi Sahit Akademi, Ludhiana awarded him the Kartar Singh Dhaliwal Sharv Sharest Award in 2002. Punjabi University, Guru Nanak Dev University and Punjabi Sahit Sabha, Delhi awarded him the life fellowships.

Notable books 

His noted books includes:

Poetry

Guddian Patole (1944)
Kaali Barchhi
Jadon Aseen Aavange
Pahu Phutala (1948)
Dharti Mangdi Meenh Ve (1952)
Patt Jharhe Purane (1955)
To the Punjab of Farid and other poems (English Translation of Dhir's Poetry)

Story

Koee Ik Sawaar
Chhittian Dee Chhaven (1950)
Saver Hon Tak (1955)
Sanjhi Kandh (1958)
Sharaab Da Glass (1970)
Sheran Dee Awaz (1988)
Pakhi (1991)

Novels

Sharaabi (1963)
Yaadgar (1979)
Hindustan Hamaara
Navaan Zamaana

See also 
Sujan Singh
Balwant Gargi

References

External links
 To the Punjab of Farid and other poems. PDF

Punjabi-language writers
Punjabi-language poets
Indian Sikhs
1920 births
2010 deaths
20th-century Indian poets
Indian male poets
Poets from Punjab, India
20th-century Indian male writers
Recipients of the Sahitya Akademi Award in Punjabi